Natasha Asghar is a Welsh Conservative Party politician who represents South Wales East in the Senedd since the 2021 Senedd election. Her father Mohammad Asghar represented the same constituency until his death in 2020. She is the first female ethnic minority member of the Senedd. She was named as one of the BBC's 100 Women in 2021.

Political career 
Asghar was named the Welsh Conservative’s Shadow Minister for Transport and Technology and worked to see the creation an All Wales Travel Card similar to the Oyster card in London.

Asghar stood as a Plaid Cymru candidate in the 2007 National Assembly for Wales election in Blaenau Gwent and for the Wales seat in the 2009 European elections before joining the Conservative party on 8 December 2009 at the same time as her father. She unsuccessfully contested Torfaen at the 2011 National Assembly for Wales election.

Asghar has been unsuccessful in her candidacy for the House of Commons seat of Newport East in 2015 and 2017.

In May 2021, Asghar was highlighted as one of British Vogue's "5 Forces For Change". Since being elected Natasha has done interviews for BBC, ITV, The South Wales Argus, The National, The Caerphilly Observer, the Welsh magazine Golwg and appeared on Sharp End.

She was named as one of the BBC's 100 Women in December 2021.

Personal life 
She is the daughter of the late Conservative assembly member Mohammad Asghar.

Education 
Asghar holds a BA in Politics and Social Policy and a Masters in Contemporary British Policy and Media from the University of London.

References 

Year of birth missing (living people)
Living people
Conservative Party members of the Senedd
Welsh people of Pakistani descent
Wales MSs 2021–2026
British politicians of Pakistani descent
Conservative Party (UK) parliamentary candidates
Female members of the Senedd
BBC 100 Women